This is a list of rulers of Guastalla, a town in Emilia-Romagna, Italy, on the right bank of the Po River. The County of Guastalla was established in 1406 for the Torelli family. In 1456, the county was partitioned, with Montechiarugolo and Casei going to Pietro Guido I Torelli.

The County of Guastalla was raised to ducal status in 1621, when it became the Duchy of Guastalla.

Lords of Guastalla
Gilberto da Correggio 1307-1321
Simone da Correggio 1321-1346, together with:
Guido da Correggio
Azzone da Correggio
Giovanni da Correggio
To the Duchy of Milan 1346-1403
Ottone Terzi 1403-1406

Counts of Guastalla
Guido Torelli 1406-1449 (Count from 1428)
Cristoforo Torelli 1449-1490
Guido Galeotto Torelli 1460-1479, together with:
Francesco Maria Torelli
Pietro Guido II Torelli 1486-1494
Achille Torelli 1494-1522
Ludovica Torelli 1522-1539
Ferrante I Gonzaga 1539-1557
Cesare I Gonzaga 1557-1575
Ferrante II Gonzaga 1575-1630 (Count until 1621, then Duke)

Dukes of Guastalla
Ferrante II Gonzaga 1575-1630 (Count before 1621)
Cesare II Gonzaga 1630-1632
Ferrante III Gonzaga 1632-1678
To the Duchy of Milan 1678-1693
Vincenzo Gonzaga 1693-1714
To France 1702-1704
Antonio Ferdinando Gonzaga 1714-1729
Giuseppe Maria Gonzaga 1729-1746
To France 1734-1738
To the Holy Roman Empire (1746–1748)
To the Duchy of Parma, Piacenza e Guastalla (1748–1806; under French occupation from 1801)
Pauline Bonaparte and Camillo Borghese (March–May 1806)
To the Kingdom of Italy (1806-1814)
To the restored Duchy of Parma, Piacenza e Guastalla (1814–1847)
To the Duchy of Modena (1847–1861)
Part of Italy (1861–present)

Footnotes

Counts of Guastalla
Dukes of Guastalla
Guastalla